Election for the Sixteenth Legislative Assembly was held in the Indian state of Punjab. Polling was done on 20 February 2022 to elect the 117 members of the Punjab Legislative Assembly. The counting of votes declaration of results was done on 10 March 2022. The Fifteenth Punjab assembly was dissolved on 11 March 2022. The dissolution was necessitated after the results of the election was declared on 10 March.

In the Sixteenth Punjab Legislative Assembly, 92 members of the ruling Aam Aadmi Party form the treasury benches. The main opposition party in the assembly is Indian National Congress with 18 seats. The other parties which are in opposition are the Shiromani Akali Dal, the Bharatiya Janata Party, the Bahujan Samaj Party and independents. AAP MLA, Kultar Singh Sandhwan was announced as the speaker of the assembly.

History 
Chief Minister Bhagwant Mann took the oath of office on March 16 at Khatkar Kalan, the ancestral village of Bhagat Singh. Inderbir Singh Nijjar took the oath as Protem Speaker. On 17 March Nijjar administered the oath of office to all the 117 legislators of the Sixteenth Punjab Legislative assembly. Other 10  cabinet ministers of the Mann ministry, took oath on 19 March.

On 22 June 2022, Speaker Kultar Singh Sandhwan announced that the Punjab legislators will get answers on all issues that they raise during the Assembly debates. The answers would be provided during the Zero Hour.  This was done for the first time in the history of Punjab Assembly.

Operation Lotus
Aam Aadmi Party, the ruling party in Punjab, accused BJP of spending ₹1375 Crore in Punjab to bribe the AAP MLAs as part of Operation Lotus. Punjab's Finance Minister Harpal Singh Cheema said in a press conference, "Our MLAs have been approached with offers of up to Rs 25 crore to break away from AAP. The MLAs were told: “bade bau ji se milwayenge”. These MLAs have also been offered big posts. They were told that if you get more MLAs along, you would be given upto Rs 75 crore," 

AAP government called a special Session of the Assembly on September 22 to bring a "confidence motion". Governor Banwarilal Purohit refused to allow permission for the special session. AAP said that Governor was acting on the behest of BJP in cancelling the September 22 session so that Operation Lotus can succeed. Business Advisory Committee of the Assembly has representatives of all the parties and it decides the legislative business that occurs in the Assembly. The opposition parties Congress, SAD and BJP hailed governors decision to prevent the special session from occurring. CM Mann said that "Gov/Presi consent before any session of Legislature is a formality. In 75 years, no Presi/Gov ever asked list of Legislative business before calling session. Legislative business is decided by BAC (Business Advisory Committee of the House) and Speaker. Next Gov will ask all speeches also to be approved by him. Its too much." On 25 September, Purohit agreed to summon the special session of the Assembly.

Leaders

Committees 
List of committees and chairpersons for the term 2022-2023.

Composition

By alliance and party

By constituency

Resolutions passed
On 22nd March, the assembly unanimously passed a resolution to install the statues of Shaheed Bhagat Singh, Dr. Bhim Rao Ambedkar and Maharaja Ranjit Singh in the assembly complex.

On 1st April, the assembly unanimously passed a resolution to immediately transfer union territory of Chandigarh — the joint capital of Punjab and Haryana, to Punjab.

On 30th June, the assembly passed a resolution recommending the state government that it urges the Government of India to immediately rollback the Agnipath scheme. The resolution was opposed by BJP members of the assembly who were in minority. Punjab was the only state to pass such a resolution.

On 30th June, the assembly passed a resolution recommending the state government that it urges the Government of India to not alter the nature and character of Panjab University. The resolution was opposed by BJP members of the assembly who were in minority.

References

16th
2022 establishments in Punjab, India
2022
punjab